Perry Benjamin Woodall (November 26, 1912 – April 25, 1975) was a U.S. politician. A Republican from Toppenish, began his legislative career in 1939 as a member of the Washington State House of Representatives. In 1957 he was chosen to fill an unexpired term in the Washington State Senate, and subsequently was reelected to four additional terms. Woodall also served as the Minority Leader in the Senate and participated in redistricting negotiations during the 1960s.

1975 deaths
1912 births
Republican Party Washington (state) state senators
Republican Party members of the Washington House of Representatives
20th-century American politicians